"I Got That" is a song by American rapper Amil, featuring collaborative vocals by American singer Beyoncé. It was released on July 5, 2000 as Amil's debut solo single, from her debut album, All Money Is Legal (2000). The song was produced by L.E.S. and Poke & Tone, and was written by Amil, Shawn Carter, Tamy Lestor Smith, Samuel J. Barnes, Leshan Lewis, Makeda Davis, and Jean-Claude Olivier. It marked one of the first songs released by Beyoncé outside of Destiny's Child. The lyrics revolve around female empowerment and independence.

"I Got That" received primarily positive reviews from music critics. It peaked at number one on the Bubbling Under R&B/Hip-Hop Singles Billboard chart. The song was promoted through a music video, and featured on the list of the most-played clips on BET and played on The Box. It was also included on the compilation albums R&B Masters (2001) and Urban Sounds: Hip-Hop & Reggae 1996–2000 (2003).

Recording and release 
"I Got That" was written by Amil Whitehead, Shawn Carter (Jay-Z), Tamy Lestor Smith, Samuel J. Barnes, Leshan Lewis, Makeda Davis, and Jean-Claude Olivier. The production was provided by L.E.S. and Poke & Tone. It was recorded in The Hit Factory and Platinum Post Studios in New York City. The track was mixed by Rich Travali and recorded by Mark Mason and Steve Sauder. The single includes collaborative vocals by singer Beyoncé. It was the first collaboration between Beyoncé and rapper Jay-Z.

"I Got That" was released on July 5, 2000, as the lead single from Amil's debut album All Money Is Legal (2000). The song was made available as a 12-inch single through Sony. It was also included on a double A-side with the album's second single "4 da Fam". "I Got That" was included on the compilation albums R&B Masters (2001), and Urban Sounds: Hip-Hop & Reggae 1996–2000 (2003). A music video was released to promote the single, and included scenes with Beyoncé. It was featured on the list of the most-played clips on BET and played on The Box for the weeks of August 1 and August 8, 2000. The video was uploaded to Amil's Vevo channel on October 7, 2009.

Composition and lyrics 
The lyrics in "I Got That" encourage women to become more independent. A contributor for Spin wrote that the song focused on "statement[s] of simple financial and romantic independence", and Sowmya Krishnamurthy of ABC News described it as "girl power-infused". Music critics compared the song's sound and lyrics to music released by the group Destiny's Child. The composition includes a sample from Gwen Guthrie's 1986 single "Seventh Heaven". A writer for the Chicago Sun-Times described the single's instrumental as "danceable", and a contributor for Knight Ridder interpreted Amil's verses as "girlish".

Reception 
"I Got That" received primarily positive reviews from music critics. In a 2015 article, a reviewer from Spin magazine praised Beyoncé's vocals on the chorus, and described the song as "squelching [and] slithering". A contributor for Billboard described the single as "a catchy enough radio-ready tune", and Kathy Iandoli of Dazed felt that it showcased Amil's potential as a rapper. David Browne of Entertainment Weekly cited "I Got That" as an example of how Amil's "sultry, sing songy rapping locks into the beats". In a negative review, a writer for Vibe criticized Amil's collaboration with Beyoncé on its list of "Matches Made in Error". On a Billboard poll asking fans to choose Beyoncé's best feature, "I Got That" received the fewest votes.

"I Got That" peaked at number one on the Bubbling Under R&B/Hip-Hop Singles Billboard chart on September 16, 2000, and remained on the chart for 12 weeks.

Track listings

Credits and personnel 
Credits adapted from the liner notes of All Money Is Legal:

Written-By – Amil Whitehead, Shawn Carter, Tamy Lestor Smith, Samuel J. Barnes, Leshan Lewis, Makeda Davis, and Jean-Claude Olivier
Produced-By – L.E.S. and Poke & Tone
Recorded By – Mark Mason, Steve Sauder
Featuring – Beyoncé
Mixed By – Rich Travali

Charts

Release history

References

External links 

2000 songs
2000 debut singles
Amil songs
Beyoncé songs
Music videos directed by Darren Grant
Roc-A-Fella Records singles
Songs written by Samuel Barnes (songwriter)
Songs written by Jean-Claude Olivier
Songs written by Jay-Z
Song recordings produced by Trackmasters
Songs with feminist themes
Songs written by Amil